NGC 1341 is a barred spiral galaxy in the constellation Fornax, 86 million light years away. It is one of the most distant members of the Fornax Cluster. Discovered by John Herschel on November 29, 1837, it is 30,000 light years in diameter and has a redshift of 1854 km/s.

See also 
NGC 1399
NGC 1365
NGC 1350
NGC 1427A

References 

Barred spiral galaxies
Fornax (constellation)
Fornax Cluster
1341
012911